Kičinica is a village in the municipality of Mavrovo and Rostuša, North Macedonia.

Demographics
In statistics gathered by Vasil Kanchov in 1900, the village of Kičinica was inhabited by 120 Orthodox Albanians, of whom could speak Bulgarian while Albanian was the language of the household. According to the 2002 census, the village had a total of 0 inhabitants.

References

Villages in Mavrovo and Rostuša Municipality
Albanian communities in North Macedonia